"Fear Campaign" is a single by Fear Factory released in 2010. This song is the second single and third track from the album Mechanize.

Lyrics
The song lyrics demonstrates a more genuine approach of Fear Factory, and according to Burton C. Bell, this song illustrates that this present world was shaped by fear and not necessarily concealing it from insanity as seen in science fiction. Bell said at the end of his quote: "Fear is bondage. Fear is slavery. Fear is Hell. Fear is control." Lyrically, this song is about fear of a variety of sufferings, including war, hate, enemy, loss, and failure, plus god and savior. The final line is 'Fear is your god'.

Music video
The music video for "Fear Campaign" was officially released on YouTube on February 16, 2010. It was directed by Ian McFarland and Mike Pecci. The video was filmed in Los Angeles and post-produced in Boston.

The first scene shows an officer with two dogs on leashes in a garage with a naked innocent man who is crouching with his back facing up. The officer sits on a chair with the two dogs, one on each side and starts singing along. The innocent man's rescuer puts on a military costume and grabs a machine gun before beginning the rescue. The officer takes a pill as he sings, then the rescuer aims at the officer and strangles him as the dogs bark. Even as the rescuer holds his throat, he still manages to sing until the song ends.

References 

Fear Factory songs
2010 singles
Songs written by Burton C. Bell
Songs written by Dino Cazares
2010 songs